Kirbyville is a village and unincorporated community located along U.S. Route 222 in Richmond Township, Berks County, Pennsylvania, United States. The village is located west of Moselem Springs, and approximately 10 minutes from Kutztown.

History
Kirbyville takes its name from the Kirby family, who operated a farm in the village and were some of the earliest settlers in Richmond Township.

In 2017, the former Kirby family farm was purchased by three Mennonite farmers, who planned to open a 6,000-square-foot farmers market, to be called the Kirbyville Farm Market, by early 2019. The site's original bank barn, which was constructed by the Kirby family approximately 200 years ago, is being restored and renovated to house the new farmers market.

References

Unincorporated communities in Berks County, Pennsylvania
Unincorporated communities in Pennsylvania